Peggy A. Pendleton (born February 9, 1946) is an American politician and registered nurse from Maine. A Democrat, Pendleton served a total of 9 terms (18 years) in the Maine Legislature. She served from 1988 to 1994 and 2006 to 2010 in the Maine House of Representatives representing part of Scarborough, Maine. From 1996 to 2004, Pendleton represented part of Cumberland County, including Scarborough, in the Maine Senate.

Education
Pendleton studied at the University of Southern Maine and Eastern Maine Medical Center School of Nursing. Pendleton is a retired nurse. She also taught at Southern Maine Vocational Technical Institute from 1980 to 1988.

References

1946 births
Living people
American nurses
American women nurses
People from Lackawanna, New York
People from Scarborough, Maine
University of Southern Maine alumni
Southern Maine Community College faculty
Democratic Party members of the Maine House of Representatives
Democratic Party Maine state senators
Women state legislators in Maine
21st-century American politicians
21st-century American women politicians
American women academics